Carolyn Zonailo (born January 21, 1947) is a Canadian poet and publisher.

Biography
Born in Vancouver, British Columbia, Canada. Zonailo studied at the University of Rochester, from which she received a B.A. in literature 1971. IN 1980, she received a M.A. in literature from Simon Fraser University. She has also studied Jungian psychology, mythology and astrology.

In 1977, she founded Caitlin Press, which she ran with Cathy Ford and Ingrid Klassen. The press was later sold and relocated to northern British Columbia.

Zonailo lives in Montreal, Quebec with her husband Stephen Morrissey and divides her time between Quebec and the West Coast.

Selected bibliography
1977:Inside Passage. Vancouver: Caitlin Press
1981:The Wide Arable Land. Vancouver: Caitlin Press
1983:A Portrait of Paradise. Vancouver: Blewointment
1985:Compendium. Vancouver: Heron
1987:Zen Fores. Vancouver: Caitlin Press
1990:The Taste of Giving: New & Selected Poems. Vancouver: Caitlin Press 
1993:Nature's Grace. Montreal: Empyreal 
1993:Poem Factory 
1995:Memory House. Montreal: Empyreal 
1997:Wading the Trout River. Montreal: Empyreal 
1998:Winter. Pointe Claire: Morgaine House 
2002:The Goddess in the Garden. Victoria: Ekstasis
2004:Holy Hours. Pointe Claire: Morgaine House

External links
Carolyn Zonailo's website
Records of Carolyn Zonailo are held by Simon Fraser University's Special Collections and Rare Books
Recordings of Carolyn Zonailo are available online in the Unarchiving the Margins Collection at Simon Fraser University's Special Collections and Rare Books

1947 births
Canadian women poets
Living people
University of Rochester alumni
Writers from Vancouver
Simon Fraser University alumni
Writers from Montreal
20th-century Canadian poets
21st-century Canadian poets
20th-century Canadian women writers
21st-century Canadian women writers